This is a categorised list of places in the principal area of Anglesey, north Wales. See the list of places in Wales for places in other principal areas.

Administrative divisions

Electoral wards
See the article on electoral wards for an explanation of this list.

Electoral wards to Isle of Anglesey County Council prior to the 2012 electoral boundary changes: 

* = remains as community ward for community council elections

Post-2012 county council wards:

Communities
This is a list of local communities:

See also
List of places in Anglesey
List of Anglesey towns by population

Anglesey